The Shadow of Zorro is a video game based on the character Zorro for PlayStation 2 and Windows. The game was published in North America by Dreamcatcher Entertainment.

Gameplay 
The game is a 3D stealth-adventure., featuring 7 chapters, 700 animated cutscenes, and 28 different locations. Gameplay includes spying and rescue missions.

Plot 
A new garrison commander, Captain Fuertes, arrives at the village. Don Alejandro de la Vega suspects that he might be the "Butcher of Zaragoza", a Spanish war criminal who committed atrocities under Napoleon. In order to uncover the truth, Zorro sets out to investigate.

Characters 
 Zorro/Diego de la Vega: the game's protagonist.
 Captain Fuertes: the game's main villain.
 Agatha: Fuertes's second-in-command, an alluring yet wicked beauty who is also an excellent sword fighter.
 Professor Augusto Orneillo: a professor held prisoner by Fuertes in order to help him translate an Indian codex. He believes Fuertes is after two ancient Aztec amulets linked to Huitzilopochtli and Chalchiuhtlicue that contain the power of good and evil.
 Carlota Orneillo: the professor's beautiful yet headstrong daughter, held hostage by Fuertes to pressure her father.
 Don Alejandro de la Vega: Zorro's father, who witnessed a massacre committed by Fuertes.
 Sergeant García: the garrison's bumbling second-in-command.

Production

Release 
A website for the title was launched in mid 2001. Cryo and Dreamcatcher officially announced the game on October 3, 2001, to be released during the holiday season later that year. The game arrived in Polish stores on September 3, 2002.

Critical reception 
Shadow of Zorro has received generally poor reviews. Futuregamez.net awarded the game 49% stating that the game "seems very underdeveloped with poor level structures." Gry Online gave it a mixed review, though praised the Flash-based website for its ingenuity.

References

External links

2001 video games
Cryo Interactive games
DreamCatcher Interactive games
PlayStation 2 games
Video games based on Zorro
Video games developed in Canada
Windows games
Video games set in California